Orgasmic Birth: The Best-Kept Secret (also called Orgasmic Birth: 11 Mothers, 12 International Experts or just Orgasmic Birth) is a 2008 documentary film that examines the intimate nature of birth. It had been shown at women's and film festivals since May 2008, before being shown for the first time in prime time on January 2, 2009 by ABC’s 20/20.

The documentary follows the journey of eleven women through labour, presenting how blissful birth can be. Interviews with experts, doctors, midwives, gynecologists, anthropologists, neonatologists, nurses, Lamaze educators, and mothers and fathers) explore how the birthing process has become a medical procedure rather than a natural process. Noted narrators include Ina May Gaskin.

While the documentary features several mothers who claim to have had an orgasm during labor, it is primarily about natural labour at the home without drugs.

Book
Orgasmic Birth: Your Guide to a Safe, Satisfying, and Pleasurable Birth Experience by Elizabeth Davis and Debra Pascali-Bonaro, was first published on June 8, 2010.

DVD release
The DVD was released in the United States on January 1, 2009, and soon after an international version was released.

Soundtrack
The soundtrack was created by John McDowell (composer of the score for the documentary Born into Brothels), with additional composition by Sabina Sciubba (of the group Brazilian Girls). It is available to buy on CD.

See also
The Business of Being Born
Home birth
Water birth

References

External links
Official Website

Works about childbirth
Books about orgasm
American documentary films
2008 documentary films
2000s pregnancy films
American pregnancy films
Documentary films about pregnancy
2000s American films